Demo 98 is the first demo and release by the Blackened death metal band Crionics. The demo is actually named Demo 98 and the cover on the right is the original cover that goes with the demo. Featuring only a calm winter nature photo, without the title and the original Crionics logo which they are still using today on their releases.

Yanuary made his first appearance on this demo, but left the band later on. He came back to Crionics after a couple of years although not as the guitarist, but as the bassist. A year after the band was formed, they recorded five songs. However, this material never saw the light because of its bad production. About six months later after they recorded the songs, the band decided to record a four-song Demo 98. This is that same demo featuring four song of the original five songs they recorded. Because of the poor equipment the material wasn’t exactly perfect, but the band decided to promote it anyway. They played a few shows and started looking for a keyboardist that would enhance their sound. Vac-V was the man that quickly became the missing link in their music and the band's music started to sound more interesting and complete at their shows. He joined the band later on and made its first appearance on their next release and first EP, Beyond the Blazing Horizon.

Track listing

 "Mystic Past" - 4:12
 "Pagan Strength" - 4:01
 "Black Warriors" - 5:29
 "I Am the Black Wizards" - 5:11 (Emperor cover)

Total playing time 18:53

Notes
  The song Black Warriors was later re-recorded on the Neuthrone release in 2007.

Personnel
 Michał "War-A.N" Skotniczny - guitars, vocals
 Dariusz "Yanuary" Styczeń - guitars
 Maciej "Carol" Zięba - drums, keymaster
 Marcotic - bass
 G. Sznyterman  - engineering

External links
 
 Encyclopaedia Metallum

1998 albums
Demo albums
Crionics albums